Sweep Away All Cow Demons and Snake Spirits (Pinyin: Héngsǎo yīqiè níuguǐ shéshén), alternatively translated as Obliterate All Ox Demons and Snake Spirits, Sweep Away All Ox-ghosts and Snake-spirits, is an editorial published by the People's Daily on June 1, 1966, calling on the masses to rise up and "sweep away all cow demons and snake spirits".

The editorial declares that "the climax of the Great Proletarian Cultural Revolution is rising in socialist China, which accounts for a quarter of the world's population." It calls on the proletariat to "completely eradicate all the old ideas, old culture, old customs and old habits that have poisoned the people of China for thousands of years, fostered by the exploiting classes."

"Cow demons and snake spirits" referred to people who were condemned during the Cultural Revolution, including condemned government leaders, intellectuals and cadres. The claim to "sweep away all cow demons and snake spirits" is actually part of the campaign to combat the "Four Olds" and maintain the "Bloodline theory".

See also
 Cultural Revolution
 Cow demons and snake spirits

References

Cultural Revolution
Campaigns of the Chinese Communist Party
Chinese words and phrases
People's Daily